Gândul ("The Thought") is a Romanian online newspaper published in Bucharest. It was founded in May 2005 by Mircea Dinescu, who used to write a daily editorial called "Vorba lu' Dinescu", and Cristian Tudor Popescu, who was also the editor-in-chief until January 2008. Its initial circulation was about 52,000. In 2006, Publimedia acquired Gândul and subsequently changed the format, nameplate and design. 

Gândul ceased print publication on 8 April 2011.

Gândul Media Network buys Gândul from Adrian Sârbu, the owner of Mediafax Group, in 2019.

See also 
 Hamangia culture, which produced The Thinker figurine similar to the one used in the newspaper's logo

External links
  

2005 establishments in Romania
Newspapers published in Bucharest
Publications established in 2005
Romanian-language newspapers